Douglas Moreira Fagundes (born 17 April 1996), commonly known as Dodi, is a Brazilian professional footballer who plays as a defensive midfielder for Santos.

Club career

Early career
Born in Santo Antônio do Sudoeste, Paraná, Dodi joined Grêmio's youth setup in 2008, aged 11. He left the club in the end of 2013, and later moved to Criciúma.

Criciúma
After initially appearing for the under-20 side, Dodi made his first team – and Série A – debut for Criciúma on 23 November 2014, starting in a 1–1 away draw against Flamengo, as his side suffered relegation. He scored his first senior goal the following 8 May, netting the opener in a 2–1 Série B away win over Mogi Mirim; it was also his debut in the competition.

Dodi became a regular starter for the club in October 2015, under manager Roberto Cavalo. He became an undisputed first-choice in the following year, and renewed his contract until December 2018 on 4 April of that year. However, he left the club shortly after, and ended his period at Tigre by scoring nine goals in 147 appearances overall.

Fluminense
On 19 April 2018, Dodi was announced at Fluminense back in the top tier, on loan until the end of the year and with a buyout clause. He made his debut for the club on 6 May, coming on as a late substitute for Pedro in a 2–1 away win over Vitória.

Despite being mainly a backup option to Richard and Jadson, Dodi signed a permanent contract with Flu on 12 January 2019, agreeing to a deal until the end of 2020. However, he was only a fourth-choice during the entire 2019 campaign, behind Yuri, Allan and Airton.

Dodi profitted from the arrival of Odair Hellmann as manager for the 2020 season, and became a starter. He refused a contract renewal in October of that year, with his agents stating that the offer was "too low", and was separated from the first team squad in November, with Fluminense releasing a note saying that the player's staff already negotiated him with a foreign club.

Kashiwa Reysol
On 10 February 2021, Dodi was announced at J1 League side Kashiwa Reysol. He made his debut abroad 
on 1 May, replacing Keiya Shiihashi in a 1–0 loss at Vegalta Sendai.

Dodi scored his first goal in Japan on 27 August 2022, netting Kashiwa's first in a 6–3 home loss against FC Tokyo.

Santos
On 14 December 2022, Dodi returned to his home country after being announced as the new signing of Santos, on a three-year contract. He made his debut for the club the following 14 January, starting in a 2–1 Campeonato Paulista home win over Mirassol.

Career statistics

Notes

Honours
 Fluminense
 Campeonato Carioca: 2020

References

External links

1996 births
Living people
Sportspeople from Paraná (state)
Brazilian footballers
Brazilian expatriate footballers
Association football midfielders
Campeonato Brasileiro Série A players
Campeonato Brasileiro Série B players
J1 League players
Criciúma Esporte Clube players
Fluminense FC players
Kashiwa Reysol players
Santos FC players
Brazilian expatriate sportspeople in Japan
Expatriate footballers in Japan